Ca' Foscari University of Venice (simply Università Ca' Foscari) is a public university in Venice, Italy. Since its foundation in 1868, it has been housed in the Venetian Gothic palace of Ca' Foscari, from which it takes its name. The palace stands on the Grand Canal, between the Rialto and San Marco, in the sestiere of Dorsoduro.

Ca' Foscari became a full-fledged university in 1968. It currently has eight departments and almost 21,000 students. Ca' Foscari's teaching and research is centred around economics & business, humanities, and modern languages. In 2017 Ca' Foscari's economics department was ranked as Italy's 3rd best, surpassed by University of Bologna and University of Padua, while it in general ranked of 5th out of 89 universities.

History

Ca' Foscari was founded as the "Regia Scuola Superiore di Commercio" (Royal High School of Commerce) by a Royal Decree dated 6 August 1868, and teaching commenced in December of the same year. The idea of establishing such a school had arisen after the annexation of the Veneto to the new Kingdom of Italy in 1866, and was promoted by three people in particular: the Jewish political economist Luigi Luzzatti, later Prime Minister of Italy; Edoardo Deodati, senator of the Kingdom of Italy and vice-president of the province of Venice; and the Sicilian political economist Francesco Ferrara, director of the school for its first thirty years.

The school was - and today the university is - the first and most prestigious institute of higher education in commerce in Italy, and was from the outset conceived as a national and international institution rather than a regional one. Ca' Foscari aimed at the education of top managers, economists, bankers, statesmen and entrepreneurs. It also had a diplomatic section to train and educate Diplomats and commercial consular staff for overseas service and international law. In addition, Ca' Foscari was also created to operate as a training college for secondary school teachers of commercial subjects. Foreign languages were taught from the start as well as the study of foreign cultures. The school was modelled on the Institut Supérieur de Commerce d'Anvers, founded in 1853 in Antwerp, Belgium.

Following the establishment of a national syllabus for university teaching in 1935, the Istituto Superiore di Economia e Commercio di Venezia, as it was by then called, was authorised to award four-year laurea degrees. In 1968 it obtained university status, and the name was changed to Università degli Studi di Venezia. In the following year two new faculties were created, of industrial chemistry and of philosophy and letters.

Currently, Ca' Foscari hosts eight strategic research centers: the Center for Cultural Heritage and Technology, the Euro-Mediterranean Center on Climate Change, the European Centre for Living Technology, the Center for Humanities and Social Change, the Institute for Global Challenges, the Marco Polo Centre, the Venice Centre for Digital and Public Humanities, and the Venice Centre in Economic and Risk Analytics for Public Policies.

Organisation
The university is divided into eight departments:
 Economics
 Philosophy and cultural heritage
 Management
 Environmental science, computer science and statistics
 Molecular science and nanosystems
 Linguistic and comparative cultural studies
 Humanities
 Asian and Mediterranean African studies

It also hosts the European Centre for Living Technology.

Corporate placement and campus drive 

Ca' Foscari provides vide network of corporate placement opportunities for its students and recently collaborated internationally for exploring students dynamics for international experience. The first Indian collaboration happened in December 2021 with TreeAndHumanKnot RisingIndia ThinkTank.

Rankings 

Ca' Foscari is ranked among the best universities in Italy, ranking 5th in 2017 out of 89 universities.

The QS World University Ranking by subject has placed Ca’ Foscari of Venice among the top 100 universities in the world for modern languages, among the top 150 in the world for humanities, and among the top 200 in the world for economics and management.

The university also ranked as the third best public university in Italy for their quality of research according to ANVUR (the National Agency for the Evaluation of University Research Systems) in 2018.

Nobel prize-winner lectures 

In 2018 six recipients of the Nobel Prize gave lectures at the university: Robert F. Engle, Martin Karplus, Mario Vargas Llosa, Robert C. Merton, Amartya Sen, Wole Soyinka and  Muhammad Yunus.

Notable alumni 

Among the alumni of the university are:
Giuseppe De'Longhi, businessman
Enrico Dallavecchia, businessman
Roberto Meneguzzo, banker and investor
Renzo Rosso, businessman, founder of the clothing brand Diesel
 Michele Boldrin, economist
 Paolo Costa, economist and politician
 Carlo Carraro, economist and Ca' Foscari's president between 2009 and 2014 
 Ugo La Malfa, politician
 Flaminio Piccoli, politician
 Lilli Gruber, politician, author, journalist and TV-personality
 Barbara Frale, historian
 Lionello Perera, banker, patron of the arts
 Paul Watzlawick, philosopher and psychologist
Damiano Michieletto, opera director
Massimiliano Frani, pianist
Lella Vignelli, architect and designer
Giuseppe Durato, manga artist

See also
List of universities in Italy

References

 
1868 establishments in Italy
Education in Venice
Educational institutions established in 1868